{{DISPLAYTITLE:C20H26O4}}
The molecular formula C20H26O4 (molar mass: 330.42 g/mol, exact mass: 330.1831084 u) may refer to:

 Carnosol
 Momilactone B

Molecular formulas